The Colorado Springs Public Library–Carnegie Building is a Neo-classical library building in Colorado Springs, Colorado. Funded by the Andrew Carnegie Library Fund. The building is on the National Register of Historic Places. It is associated with the City Beautiful movement.

History
Andrew Carnegie donated $60,000 for the construction of the library. One side of the library is semi-circular with a continuous ornamental balcony and a view of Pikes Peak and the Rocky Mountains. The building is made of granite, gray Tennessee marble, Breche Violette marble, sandstone and Roman-shaped gray hydraulic press brick. Inside the library the building had reading rooms, space for 17,000 volumes, an auditorium, and a reference room. Calvin Kiessling, the architect for the building, said "the building lends itself to all the requirements of modern library purposes and affords its patrons the unrestricted enjoyment of the beauties of the distant mountains and immediate surrounding."

The Penrose Library was built in 1967 as an addition to the library. The Carnegie Library has a "cherished" collection on the city's history.

Collections
The Carnegie building holds genealogy and regional history collections, which include books, archives, manuscripts, photographs, periodical and maps. Besides print materials, the library has access to genealogical databases and is a FamilySearch affiliate library.

Demonstration garden
A demonstration garden was opened in 2007 alongside the library. It was created by a Master Gardner, library staff and volunteers. The purpose of the garden is to provide a retreat space in the city and place to learn about plants selected for the Colorado Springs climate. The garden area has sculptures made by local artists, benches, stone walls, and a stage.

See also
 History of Colorado Springs, Colorado

References

Libraries on the National Register of Historic Places in Colorado
Colorado State Register of Historic Properties
Buildings and structures in Colorado Springs, Colorado
National Register of Historic Places in Colorado Springs, Colorado